The Temptress is a 1920 British silent romance film directed by George Edwardes-Hall and starring Yvonne Arnaud, Langhorn Burton and John Gliddon.

Cast
 Yvonne Arnaud as Amy Howard  
 Langhorn Burton as Allan Ashton  
 John Gliddon as Paul Howard  
 Christine Maitland as Mrs. Tredgett  
 Austin Leigh as John Howard  
 Edward Sorley as Arthur Stanley  
 Bruce Winston as Reggie Featherstone  
 Lennox Pawle as Perkins  
 Saba Raleigh as Mrs. Tredgett

References

Bibliography
 Low, Rachael. History of the British Film, 1918-1929. George Allen & Unwin, 1971.

External links
 

1920 films
1920s romance films
British romance films
British silent feature films
British black-and-white films
1920s English-language films
1920s British films